Nanikhir High School (NHS) is a secondary school in the town of Nanikhir, Gopalganj District, Bangladesh.

History
Nanikhir High School was established during the British rule in Bangladesh in 1937. Some of the country's famous students studied there. Surendra Nath Dutta commonly known as SN Dutta was the founder of the Nanikhir High School, which founded ar 1937. Mr. Dutta has gone to India after India Pakistan formation at 1947. SN Dutta was assigned by a Force TC to higher study at England order by the British Government. He married a British woman when he lived in London. After return from England he founded two schools, one is Nanikhir High School and another was a girls school but the Nanikhir High School is still exist.

References

External links
 NHS link in Directory of Secondary & Higher Secondary Education
 Nanikhir High School's official Website

High schools in Bangladesh
1937 establishments in India